The 2018 World U20 Championships in Athletics, also known as the World Junior Championships, was an international athletics competition for athletes qualifying as juniors (born no earlier than 1 January 1999) which was held  at Tampere Stadium in Tampere, Finland on 10–15 July 2018. The championships were originally awarded to Tampere by the IAAF in March, 2016.

Schedule

All dates are EEST (UTC+3)

Qualifying Standards

Men's results

Track 

  (World Junior Record),  (World Junior Leader),  (Championship Record),  (Area Junior Record),  (National Junior Record ),  (Personal Best),  (Season Best)

Field 

  (World Junior Record),  (World Junior Leader),  (Championship Record),  (Area Junior Record),  (National Junior Record ),  (Personal Best),  (Season Best)

Women's results

Track 

  (World Junior Record),  (World Junior Leader),  (Championship Record),  (Area Junior Record),  (National Junior Record ),  (Personal Best),  (Season Best)

Field 

  (World Junior Record),  (World Junior Leader),  (Championship Record),  (Area Junior Record),  (National Junior Record ),  (Personal Best),  (Season Best)

Medal table 

Kenya won the ranking in the medal table.

Placing table
USA won the ranking in the placing table.

Participation
The following is a list of participating nations with the number of qualified athletes in brackets. A country without any qualified athlete could enter either one male or one female. A total 156 countries (plus the teams from Authorized Neutral Athletes and Athlete Refugee team) and 1462 athletes are scheduled to compete.

References

External links

 Official Site

 
World Junior Championships
World Junior Championships
Sports competitions in Tampere
International athletics competitions hosted by Finland
IAAF World U20 Championships
2018 IAAF World U20 Championships